Tina Connelly (born August 16, 1970 in New Westminster, British Columbia) is a retired female track and field athlete from Canada, who competed in the long-distance events. She represented her native country at the 2000 Summer Olympics, finishing in 37th place in the women's 10.000 metres. Connelly claimed the bronze medal in the women's 10.000 metres at the 1999 Pan American Games in Winnipeg.

Achievements
All results regarding marathon, unless stated otherwise

References

External links
 
 
 
 
 

1970 births
Living people
Canadian female long-distance runners
Athletes (track and field) at the 1999 Pan American Games
Athletes (track and field) at the 2000 Summer Olympics
Olympic track and field athletes of Canada
Sportspeople from New Westminster
Pan American Games bronze medalists for Canada
Pan American Games medalists in athletics (track and field)
World Athletics Championships athletes for Canada
Medalists at the 1999 Pan American Games
21st-century Canadian women
20th-century Canadian women